Lisa Faust (born November 9, 1966 in Vancouver, British Columbia) is a former field hockey player from Canada, who earned a total number of 118 international caps for the Canadian Women's National Team during her career. On national level the midfielder played for Vancouver Hawks.

Later on in her hockey career Faust became Head Coach of Simon Fraser University Women's Field Hockey Team.

International Senior Tournaments
 1995 – Pan American Games, Mar del Plata, Argentina (3rd)
 1995 – Olympic Qualifier, Cape Town, South Africa (7th)
 1997 – World Cup Qualifier, Harare, Zimbabwe (11th)
 1998 – Commonwealth Games, Kuala Lumpur, Malaysia (not ranked)
 1999 – Pan American Games, Winnipeg, Manitoba, Canada (3rd)
 2001 – Americas Cup, Kingston, Jamaica (3rd)
 2001 – World Cup Qualifier, Amiens/Abbeville, France (10th)
 2002 – Commonwealth Games, Manchester, England (7th)

External links
 Profile on Field Hockey Canada

1966 births
Living people
Canadian female field hockey players
Canadian field hockey coaches
Field hockey players from Vancouver
Canadian people of German descent
Pan American Games medalists in field hockey
Pan American Games bronze medalists for Canada
Field hockey players at the 1995 Pan American Games
Medalists at the 1995 Pan American Games
Field hockey players at the 1998 Commonwealth Games
Field hockey players at the 2002 Commonwealth Games
Commonwealth Games competitors for Canada